Daniel Quigley (born 16 May 1988) is a New Zealand coxswain.

In 2006 Quigley was selected as cox in the New Zealand four, along with James Dallinger, Steven Cottle, Paul Gerritsen, and Dane Boswell. They won gold at the FISA Under 23 World Championships also setting a new world-record time of 6.03 in Hazelwinkel, Belgium  and bronze at the World Championships in Eton, UK.

References

1988 births
Living people
New Zealand male rowers
World Rowing Championships medalists for New Zealand
Coxswains (rowing)